Isothea is a genus of fungi in the family Phyllachoraceae.

References

Sordariomycetes genera
Phyllachorales